P. J. Cowan (born November 21, 1967) is an American professional golfer. He won the Nike Tallahassee Open on the 1996 Nike Tour.

Early life
Cowan was born in Hicksville, New York. After earning a full scholarship to St. Johns University, Cowan won the 1988 Big East Championship.

Career
Cowan turned professional in 1990 and won on the Nike Tour (now Web.com Tour) in 1996 at the Nike Tallahassee Open. Cowan was the first alternate at the 1995 U.S. Open at Shinnecock In 1997, he played in the U.S. Open at Congressional but missed the cut. Cowan is a three-time Met PGA Assistant Player of the Year Award winner and is also a 3 time New York State Open champion.

Amateur wins
1987 Long Island Amateur, Havemeyer Invitational
1988 Big East Championship
1989 Guadalajara Amateur

Professional wins (7)

Nike Tour wins (1)

Nike Tour playoff record (1–0)

Other wins (6)
1995 Bahamas National Open
1999 Bermuda Open
1997 Portugal Azores Open, New York State Open
1998 New York State Open
2000 New York State Open

Results in major championships

CUT = missed the halfway cut
Note: Cowan only played in the U.S. Open.

References

External links

American male golfers
St. John's Red Storm men's golfers
PGA Tour golfers
Golfers from New York (state)
People from Hicksville, New York
1967 births
Living people